R (World Development Movement Ltd) v Secretary of State for Foreign Affairs [1995] EWHC Admin 1 is a UK constitutional law case, concerning judicial review.

Facts
The World Development Movement claimed the Foreign Secretary's decision to fund the Pergau Dam project in Malaysia was not providing quality aid. It claimed it represented broader public interests, including of people in developing countries. The Foreign Secretary argued it should not have standing by having a sufficient interest. The WDM claimed the Foreign Secretary had misused powers conferred by the legislation.

Judgment
The High Court held that the WDM had a sufficient interest, and that too much money was spent on the dam.

Rose LJ said the following:

See also

UK constitutional law

References

 Hare, Ivan. “Judicial Review and the Pergau Dam.” The Cambridge Law Journal, vol. 54, no. 2, 1995, pp. 227–230. JSTOR, www.jstor.org/stable/4508068.

United Kingdom constitutional case law